Robert M. "Bob" Wachter is an academic physician and author. He is on the faculty of University of California, San Francisco, where he is chairman of the Department of Medicine, the Lynne and Marc Benioff Endowed Chair in Hospital Medicine, and the Holly Smith Distinguished Professor in Science and Medicine. He is generally regarded as the academic leader of the hospitalist movement, the fastest growing specialty in the history of modern medicine. He and a colleague, Lee Goldman, are known for coining the term "hospitalist" in a 1996 New England Journal of Medicine article.

Education 
Wachter attended college and medical school at the University of Pennsylvania. He completed a residency and chief residency in internal medicine at UCSF, then was a Robert Wood Johnson Clinical Scholar in Health Policy, Ethics, and Epidemiology at Stanford University. He joined the faculty at UCSF in 1990.

In 2011, Wachter studied patient safety and hospital medicine at Imperial College London as a Fulbright Scholar. He was a visiting scholar at the Harvard Chan School of Public Health in 2015, where he studied and wrote about the digital transformation of healthcare.

COVID-19 pandemic 

During the COVID-19 pandemic, Wachter gained attention for his posts on Twitter. His tweets on Covid-19 were viewed over 300 million times by more than 250,000 followers and served, for some, as a trusted source of information on the clinical, public health, and policy issues surrounding the pandemic.

Honors 
His honors include selection as the most influential physician-executive in the United States (Modern Healthcare magazine, 2015), the John M. Eisenberg award (nation’s top honor in patient safety, 2004), and election to the National Academy of Medicine (2020). He is also a Master of the American College of Physicians.

Books 
 "The Digital Doctor: Hope, Hype, and Harm at the Dawn of Medicine's Computer Age" (2015)
 "Understanding Patient Safety, 3rd Edition" (2017; with Kiran Gupta)
 Internal Bleeding: The Truth Behind America's Terrifying Epidemic of Medical Mistakes (2005)

References

External links 
 "Doctors are Tweeting about Coronavirus to Make Facts go Viral"" By Georgia Wells, "The Wall Street Journal", 2020.
 "Zero to 50,000: The 20th Anniversary of the Hospitalist" By Robert M. Wachter, MD and Lee Goldman, MD, 2016.
 "Making IT Work: Harnessing the Power of Health Information Technology to Improve Care in England" By Robert M. Wachter and the NHS Health IT Advisory Board, 2016.
 "Robert Wachter Discusses His New Book, The Digital Doctor: Hope, Hype, and Harm at the Dawn of Medicine's Computer Age"
 "Review of "The Digital Doctor"" By Abigail Zuger, "The New York Times", 2015.
 "Why Health Care Tech is Still So Bad" By Robert M. Wachter, The New York Times, 2015.
 "Holding Doctors Accountable For Medical Errors" By Pauline Chen The New York Times, 2009.
 "The Emerging Role of “Hospitalists” in the American Health Care System" By Robert M. Wachter, MD and Lee Goldman, MD, 1996.
 "Balancing 'No Blame' with Accountability in Patient Safety" By Robert M. Wachter, MD and Peter J. Pronovost, MD, PhD, 2009.

External links 
 
 

Living people
University of California, San Francisco faculty
1957 births
University of California, San Francisco alumni
20th-century American physicians
21st-century American physicians
University of Pennsylvania alumni
Perelman School of Medicine at the University of Pennsylvania alumni
Stanford University fellows
Members of the National Academy of Medicine
Physicians from New York City